This is a list of German television related events from 1979.

Events
17 March - Dschinghis Khan are selected to represent Germany at the 1979 Eurovision Song Contest with their song "Dschinghis Khan". They are selected to be the twenty-fourth German Eurovision entry during Ein Lied für Jerusalem held at the Rudi-Sedlmayer-Halle in Munich.

Debuts

ARD
 8 January – 
  (1979)
 Spaß muß sein (1979–1983) 
 8 February – Erlesene Verbrechen und makellose Morde (1979)
 10 March – Die Koblanks (1979)
 1 April – Jerusalem, Jerusalem (1979)
 24 April – Zwei Mann um einen Herd (1979)
 14 May – 
 (1979)
Vorsicht! Frisch gewachst! (1979)
 30 June – Fast wia im richtigen Leben (1979–1988) 
 11 July – Die unsterblichen Methoden des Franz Josef Wanninger (1979–1982) 
 24 July – Tochter des Schweigens (1979)
 20 August – Kümo Henriette (1979–1982)
 27 August – Iron Gustav (1979)
 17 September – Spaß beiseite - Herbert kommt! (1979–1981)
 20 September – Die Magermilchbande (1979)
 24 September – Parole Chicago (1979)
 30 September –  (1979)
 15 October – The Buddenbrooks (1979)
 18 October – Der Millionenbauer (1979–1988)
 30 October – Zimmer frei – UNO-Nähe (1979–1980)
 9 November – St. Pauli-Landungsbrücken (1979–1982)
 15 November – Der ganz normale Wahnsinn (1979–1980)
 16 November – Anna (1979–1981)
 18 December – Das verbotene Spiel (1979)
 Unknown – Freundinnen (1979)

ZDF
 7 January – Pusteblume (1979–1980)
 8 January – Die Protokolle des Herrn M (1979)
 23 April – Achtung Kunstdiebe (1979)
 30 April – Union der festen Hand (1979)
 5 June – Der Sklave Calvisius (1979)
 27 July – Locker vom Hocker (1979–1987)
 6 September – Wie erziehe ich meinen Vater? (1979)
 2 December – Mathias Sandorf (1979)
 13 December – Der Bürgermeister (1979)
 25 December – Timm Thaler (1979–1980)
 26 December –  (1979–1980)

DFF
 1 January –  Spuk unterm Riesenrad (1979)
 20 July – Ein offenes Haus (1979)

Armed Forces Network
 Dallas (1978–1991)

Television shows

1950s
Tagesschau (1952–present)

1960s
 heute (1963–present)

1970s
heute-journal (1978–present)
Tagesthemen (1978–present)

Ending this year

Births
29 January - Sarah Kuttner, TV host & author

Deaths